Novak Djokovic defeated John Millman in the final, 6–3, 6–2 to win the 2019 Japan Open.

Daniil Medvedev was the reigning champion, but did not defend his title.

Seeds

Draw

Finals

Top half

Bottom half

Qualifying

Seeds

Qualifiers

Qualifying draw

First qualifier

Second qualifier

Third qualifier

Fourth qualifier

References

External links
Main draw
Qualifying draw

Singles